The Seaward Fox is an American trailerable sailboat that was designed by Nick Hake as a pocket cruiser and first built in 1993.

The Fox is a development of the 1981 Slipper 17.

Production
The design was built by Hake Yachts in the United States, from 1993 until 2007, but it is now out of production.

Design
The Seaward Fox is a recreational keelboat, built predominantly of fiberglass, with wood trim. It has a fractional sloop rig or unstayed catboat rig with a tall mast, an optional bowsprit, a nearly plumb stem, a slightly angled transom, a transom-hung rudder controlled by a tiller and a fixed shoal-draft wing keel. It displaces  and carries  of ballast.

The boat is normally fitted with a small  outboard motor for docking and maneuvering.

The design has sleeping accommodation for four people, with a double "V"-berth in the bow cabin and two straight settee berths in the main cabin. The galley is located on both sides just aft of the bow cabin. The galley is equipped with a stove to port and a sink to starboard. The head is located in the bow cabin, centered aft, under the "V"-berth.

Operational history
In a 2010 review Steve Henkel wrote, "designer Hake has taken the same basic beamy hull that he created in 1979 with the Slipper Deckhouse 17  ... spruced her up with fancier oval ports and other gear, increased some of her dimensions slightly. and changed her name. For a while she was available with either a sloop rig or a very tall cat rig (bridge clearance 33' for the cat, 8' less for the sloop) ... Best features: We think she's relatively good-looking, with springy sheer, pronounced tumblehome, molded bulwarks, and nice fittings such as shiny stainless opening oval ports and cowl vent on the cabintop. Her self-bailing cockpit is deep and comfortable for two people, and her interior is relatively spacious considering her modest LOD; her Space Index is highest of her comp[etitor]s. The rotating freestanding carbon-fiber mast is 28' 6" long, weighs only 33 pounds, and is secured by a two-footlong sliding aluminum tube inside the mast, which couples the upper mast to a rotating mast bearing on the deck, It is claimed that the vessel takes less than five minutes to rig at a boat ramp, Worst features: Her shallow fixed keel, despite the small wings, prevents pointing as high as her comp[etitor]s, especially in light air."

See also	
List of sailing boat types

References

External links
Video of sailing a Seaward Fox

Keelboats
1990s sailboat type designs
Sailing yachts 
Trailer sailers
Sailboat type designs by Nick Hake
Sailboat types built by Hake Yachts